Olev Raju (born 14 January 1948 in Tartu) is an Estonian economist and politician. He was a member of the VIII Riigikogu and IX Riigikogu.

He has been a member of Estonian Centre Party.

References

Living people
1948 births
20th-century Estonian economists
Estonian educators
Estonian Centre Party politicians
Members of the Riigikogu, 1995–1999
Members of the Riigikogu, 1999–2003
University of Tartu alumni
Academic staff of the University of Tartu
21st-century Estonian economists
Politicians from Tartu